Events in the year 2020 in Macau, China.

Incumbents 

 Chief Executive: Ho Iat Seng
 President of the Legislative Assembly: Chui Sai Cheong

Events
 22 January – The region confirmed its two first COVID-19 cases, that of a 52-year-old woman and of a 66-year-old man, both from Wuhan.
 19 June – 300 Filipinos who were living in Macau were airlifted in an operation headed by the Philippine Consulate General of the territory.

References 

 
Years of the 21st century in Macau
Macau
Macau
2020s in Macau